The 1984 World Championship Tennis Finals, also known by its sponsored name Buick WCT Finals, was a tennis tournament played on indoor carpet courts. It was the 14th edition of the WCT Finals and was part of the 1984 World Championship Tennis circuit. It was played at the Reunion Arena in Dallas, Texas in the United States and was held from April 24 through April 30, 1984. First-seeded and defending champion John McEnroe won the title and the accompanying $150,000 first-prize money. It was his fourth WCT Finals title, a record, and his sixth successive final.

Final

Singles

 John McEnroe defeated  Jimmy Connors 6–1, 6–2, 6–3
 It was McEnroe's 5th singles title of the year and the 51st of his career.

References

External links
 ITF tournament edition details

 
World Championship Tennis Finals
WCT Finals